Sha-ri Pendleton (born 5 December 1963) is a former world-class hurdler, javelin thrower, and aspiring bodybuilder of the mid, and late 1980s.

Biography

Pendleton was born in 1963. At a young age Sha-ri was a very active child; she started competing in track for a track team by the name of the West Vernon Jets in Los Angeles, California when she was twelve years of age. Sha-ri really enjoyed track because she was a fast runner and she enjoyed winning track competitions. At first she ran the 220 and 440 and later on as she continued to improve her skills in track she ran the 200 and 400 meter events.

Pendleton continued to run hurdles in high school and won the city championships two years in a row. Then at the age of sixteen she discovered weight training. Sha-ri enjoyed weight training, and found that it helped her improve her abilities in track, but ran into some trouble because of it. In high school and college her track coaches tried to keep her out of the weight room, fearing that weights would interfere with her athletic performance. But Pendleton refused and continued to weight train because she knew that would not be the case.

Pendleton continued her education at the University of Nebraska on an athletic scholarship. She continued her athletic success as well, winning a number of big-8 titles in the hurdles, and setting some NCAA records. She started competing in the triple jump, but was not successful in this event. Sha-ri returned to California after graduating and began training with the World Class Track Club of UCLA alongside athletes such as Florence Griffith-Joyner and Jackie Joyner Kersee.  There she was coached by Bob Kersee.

With Bob Kersee's help Pendleton trained for the 1992 Summer Olympics. Her goal was to make the American team for the 1988 Olympics in Seoul, Korea, but she was unable to do so due to a pulled hamstring. As a sub-caliber sprinter, Pendleton then decided to train to represent the United States at the 1992 Olympics in Barcelona as a javelin competitor.

While preparing for the Olympics Sha-ri also participated in a few bodybuilding competitions. She placed 2nd at the Nebraska Championships in 1984, and 4th at the 1989 Los Angeles Championships. She quickly decided to take a break from competing saying that in order for her to be successful at bodybuilding she would have to focus on it. Since she was focusing on trying for the Olympics she could not give bodybuilding her full attention at that time.

Sha-ri joined the American Gladiators in 1989 as Blaze and competed for three years until 1992.

Bodybuilding philosophy

Pendleton trains with weights six times a week. She uses many free weights with relatively few machines. She uses many powerlifting exercises such as squats, deadlifts, shoulder presses and so on to make her muscle tone bigger in less time and become stronger.

Profile

Full Name: Sha-ri Pendleton
Place of Birth: Iceland
Occupation: Personal trainer, fitness model, hurdler, javelin thrower, actress
Marital Status: Married.
Height: 5'8"
Weight (In Season): 140-145 lbs. (Off-Season): 155-160 lbs.
Eye Color: Brown
Hair Color: black (originally), Brown

Contest history

1984 Nebraska Championships 2nd
1986 The Pride of LA 1st
1988 Los Angeles Championships 4th
1988 ABBC Natural International Championships 1st (Tall), and  Overall Winner
1989 Los Angeles Championships 4th
1989 NPC Los Angeles Championships 5th (HW)

Filmography

1989-1992: American Gladiators (TV series) - as Blaze
1993: Renegade (TV) - as Cannon (credited as Sha-Ri Mitchell)
1995: The Alien Within - as Fife
1999: Hard Time: The Premonition (TV) - as Vinnie
2000: Knockout - as a Female Boxer

References

 Dobbins, Bill.  "Muscling-in" on the '92 Olympics .  California: Muscle & Fitness, 1990. ISSN 0744-5105. (Woodland Hills, I, Brute Enterprises, 1989.) Magazine section: Women, pages 124-127, 212, 214, and 215 cover Sha-ri Pendleton's article.

External links

American Gladiators Blaze Profile (GladiatorsTV.com)
Muscle Memory Information

1963 births
Living people
African-American female bodybuilders
American female sprinters
Icelandic female bodybuilders
21st-century African-American people
21st-century African-American women
20th-century African-American sportspeople
20th-century African-American women